Municipal road or municipal way is or was a category of roads which are owned and/or maintained by municipalities. Generally, transit sections of higher-class roads through the built-up area is counted as part of the higher-class road, not as a municipal road. Some countries use the term local road or local communication in similar sense.

Situation in various countries 
 Gemeindestraße in Germany. There are distinguished Ortsstraßen (local roads) in built-up area and Gemeindeverbindungsstraßen (GVS, roads of municipal connection) for connection of municipalities or municipal parts. GVSs exist in several bundeslands only, e.g. Bavaria and  Baden-Württemberg.
 Gemeindestraße in Austria 
 Gemeindestraße in Switzerland; this classification express who is the administrator only; it is independent on the importance classification (main roads, secondary roads). 
 route communale in France
 strada comunale in Italy
 drum comunal (DC) in Romania
 droga gminna in Poland; municipal road can belong to one of 5 classes by traffic importance: GP (drogi główne ruchu przyspieszonego; main roads of accelerated traffic), G (drogi główne, main roads), Z (drogi zbiorcze, collection roads), L (drogi lokalne, local roads), D (drogi dojazdowe, access roads). A municipal road cannot belong to categories S (drogi ekspresowe, expressways) nor A (autostrady, freeways). 
 obecní silnice or obecní cesta in Czech lands and Slovakia (in Czechoslovakia until 1961), Zakarpattia and other countries of Austria-Hungary; municipalities were constituted in 1850 in Austria-Hungary; road law was created separately for individual countries of the empire (Bohemia, Moravia, Czech Silesia etc.) in 1860s and 1870s. In Czechoslovakia (and consequently in separated Czechia and Slovakia), the term was replaced with the new concept "místní komunikace" (local communication) since 1961. 
 Municipal Road information for Victoria Australia

See also 
 Hierarchy of roads

References

Types of roads
Municipalities
Municipal roads